Amanda Forsythe (born  1976) is an American light lyric soprano who is particularly admired for her interpretations of baroque music and the works of Rossini. Forsythe has received continued critical acclaim from many publications including Opera News, The New York Times, The Wall Street Journal and the Boston Globe.

Early life and education
Amanda Forsythe was born in 1976 in New York City, with a sister, and grew up on Roosevelt Island and later in Lloyd Harbor, New York, where she graduated from Cold Spring Harbor High School. She entered Vassar College in 1994 where she initially studied marine biology. Forsythe graduated from Vassar in 1998 with a degree in music and went on to graduate studies in vocal performance at the New England Conservatory of Music. While there she was a student of Mary Ann Hart and Susan Clickner. Forsythe was not accepted into the conservatory's opera workshop program, so the soprano ended up seeking performance opportunities elsewhere while continuing to study at NECM. Forsythe ended up performing in a production of Cavalli's Giasone at Harvard University. This production impacted Forsythe's life positively in both professional and personal ways. The opera introduced her to her husband, conductor Edward Elwyn Jones (they met while doing this opera and married in the summer of 2005) and Martin Pearlman, the director of Boston Baroque. Pearlman came to one of the opera's performances and was so intrigued by Forsythe's performance that he asked her to come and audition. Forsythe has subsequently been cast in numerous productions with the company.

In 2003, she was the winner of the George London Foundation Awards and the second-place winner of the Liederkranz Foundation competition.  Forsythe received an honorable mention in the 2005 Walter W. Naumburg Foundation Awards.  She was also a vocal fellow at Tanglewood Music Center for two summers and has apprenticed at Chicago's Ravinia Festival and the Caramoor Festival. At Tanglewood, she originated the role of young Margarita in the world premiere of Osvaldo Golijov's Ainadamar and replaced Dawn Upshaw in the lead role for one performance.

Career
Forsythe made her professional debut in 2001 as Proserpina/Ninfa in Monteverdi's L'Orfeo with Boston Baroque.

In the 2002–2003 season, Forsythe performed the role of Cleopatra in Handel's Giulio Cesare in Egitto with Hudson Opera Theatre. She also performed the role of Amore in Monteverdi's Il ritorno d'Ulisse in patria with Boston Baroque.

In the 2003–2004 season, Forsythe performed Bach's Wedding and Coffee Cantatas and the role of Oberto in Handel's Alcina with Boston Baroque.
She also made her debut at the Caramoor Festival in two productions created by the Handel and Haydn Society. These included the role of Cendrillon in Pauline Viardot's Cendrillon, and as Un Trojano in Gluck's Paride ed Elena.

In the 2004–2005 season, Forsythe performed the role of Serpina in Pergolesi's La serva padrona with Boston Baroque.

In the 2005–2006 season, Forsythe made her debut with Opera Boston and Opera Unlimited  as the Angel in Peter Eötvös's Angels in America. She also sang various roles in Boston Baroque's production of Purcell's The Fairy-Queen, including the role of the Chinese woman who sings the famous aria "Hark how the echoing air".

In the 2006–2007 season, Forsythe made her debut at the Boston Early Music Festival performing the role of Aglaure in the North American premiere of Lully's Psyché. She also recorded the role in the landmark first recording of this opera. In addition, she sang the role of Vagaus in Boston Baroque's production of Vivaldi's oratorio Juditha triumphans. She also sang Handel's Messiah with the Charlotte Symphony and Apollo's Fire.

In the 2007–2008 season, Forsythe made her European debut singing Corinna in Rossini's Il viaggio a Reims at the Rossini Opera Festival in Pesaro. She also made her debuts at the Grand Théâtre de Genève and the Bayerische Staatsoper as Dalinda in Handel's Ariodante, and returned to Opera Boston to perform the role of Iris in Handel's Semele. She also reprised the role of Young Margarita in Osvaldo Golijov's Ainadamar with the Calgary Philharmonic. In addition, Forsythe will perform Mahler's 2nd Symphony with the Orquesta Sinfónica Nacional de Mexico and will also make her debut at La Fenice in a concert of Rossini arias.

In the 2008–2009 season, Forsythe is scheduled to sing Rosalia in Rossini's L'equivoco stravagante and in a recital with Joyce DiDonato at the Rossini Opera Festival. She will also perform the role of Atalanta in Handel's Xerxes with Boston Baroque, Venus in Blow's Venus and Adonis at the winter Boston Early Music Festival, Barbarina in Mozart's Le nozze di Figaro at the Théâtre des Champs-Élysées, and Ellenia in Christoph Graupner's Antiochus und Stratonica at the summer Boston Early Music Festival. Additionally, Forsythe will appear in concerts with the Netherlands Radio Symphony Orchestra, Apollo's Fire: the Cleveland Baroque Orchestra, Orquesta Sinfónica de Tenerife, and at the Festival Casals.

Ms. Forsythe can be heard as Minerve and La Grande Pretresse on the Boston Early Music Festival recording of Lully's Thésée, a nominee for the 50th Grammy awards and Eurydice in Charpentier’s La Descente d’Orphèe aux Enfers H 488.

Forsythe has also performed at the Harvard Early Music Society and with the Masterworks Chorale, the Los Angeles Philharmonic, the Rhode Island Philharmonic, the Florestan Project, the Omaha Symphony, the Hartford Symphony, the Louisiana Philharmonic, and the Boston Chamber Music Society among other organizations.

In the 2017-2018 season, Forsythe performed the role of Iole in Handel's Hercules with the Handel and Haydn Society.

Opera roles

 Aglaure, Psyché (Lully)
 Amenaide, Tancredi (Rossini)
 Amore, Il ritorno d'Ulisse in patria (Monteverdi)
 Amore, Orfeo ed Euridice (Gluck)
 Angel, Angels in America (Peter Eötvös)
 Atalanta, Xerxes (Handel)
 Barbarina, The Marriage of Figaro (Mozart)
 Cendrillon, Cendrillon (Pauline Viardot)
 Cleopatra, Giulio Cesare in Egitto (Handel)
 Corinna, Il viaggio a Reims (Rossini)
 Dalinda, Ariodante (Handel)

 Ellenia, Antiochus und Stratonica (Christoph Graupner)
 Iris, Semele (Handel)
 Proserpina, L'Orfeo (Monteverdi)
 Rosalia, L'equivoco stravagante (Rossini)
 Serpina, La serva padrona (Pergolesi)
 Un Trojano, Paride ed Elena (Gluck)
 Venus, Venus and Adonis (John Blow)
 Young Margarita, Ainadamar (Osvaldo Golijov)

References

External links
 Official website of Amanda Forsythe

1976 births
Living people
American operatic sopranos
Harvard University people
New England Conservatory alumni
Vassar College alumni
People from Roosevelt Island
People from Lloyd Harbor, New York
Singers from New York City
21st-century American women opera singers
Classical musicians from New York (state)
Cold Spring Harbor Jr./Sr. High School alumni